Planet Zero is the seventh studio album by American rock band Shinedown, released on July 1, 2022. The release date was originally set for April 22, 2022, but was postponed due to a delay in CD and vinyl production. The album topped the all-genre Billboard Top Album Sales chart, a first for the band.

Background
It was announced on January 26, 2022, alongside the lead single of the same name. It was produced and mixed by bassist Eric Bass, making it the second album to be handled by Bass following Attention Attention. It was written and recorded during the COVID-19 pandemic in Bass' newly built Big Animal Studio in Charleston, South Carolina. The sound is described by lead singer Brent Smith as much more stripped down in terms of sound than previous records. He also describes it as "controversial" and it would touch upon subjects that the band has shied away from in the past.

Release and promotion
On January 26, 2022, the band released the lead single, "Planet Zero". The album was originally set to be released on April 22, 2022. The single went on to reach number one on the Billboard Mainstream Rock Airplay chart on the March 5, 2022 dated chart and remained atop the tally for eight weeks. On March 25, the band released a second song, "The Saints of Violence and Innuendo". On April 12, the band announced that the album's release was being pushed back to July 1, 2022. The delay was due to a delay in vinyl production, and the band's desire to have all their fans experience the album at the same time in all formats. On June 1, the band released the second single, "Daylight". On June 21, the band launched the "Planet Zero Observer", an augmented reality web app. The app visualized the planet in orbit, along with interactive symbols that revealed exclusive teasers.

Track listing

Personnel 
Shinedown
 Brent Smith – vocals
 Zach Myers – guitar
 Eric Bass – bass, production, mixing, engineering
 Barry Kerch – drums

Additional personnel
 Ted Jensen – mastering
 Doug McKean – engineering
 Dave Bassett – additional production, additional engineering
 Jeremy "Hoogie" Donais – bass technician, guitar technician
 Mike Fasano – drum technician
 Eric Wayne Rickert – engineering assistance

Imagery
 Mark Obriski – art direction and design
 Mark Stutzman – illustration

Charts

References 

2022 albums
Shinedown albums
Atlantic Records albums